Trichromia lophosticta is a moth in the family Erebidae. It was described by William Schaus in 1911. It is found in French Guiana, Bolivia and Costa Rica.

References

Moths described in 1911
lophosticta